The 2019–20 Frosinone Calcio season is Frosinone Calcio's first season back in second division of the Italian football league, the Serie B, and the 31st as a football club. Besides the Serie B, the club also competed in the 2019–20 Coppa Italia, losing in the fourth round to Serie A side Parma.

Players

First-team squad

Out on loan

Competitions

Overview

Serie B

League table

Results summary

Results by round

Matches

Promotion play-offs

Coppa Italia

Statistics

Goalscorers

References

External links

Frosinone Calcio seasons
Frosinone Calcio